Pimelea neoanglica, commonly known as poison pimelea or scanty riceflower, is a species of flowering plant in the family Thymelaeaceae and is endemic to inland areas of eastern Australia. It is an erect, dioecious shrub with narrowly elliptic leaves and heads of greenish-yellow flowers.

Description
Flowering occurs in most months, but with a peak in September and October.

Taxonomy
Pimelea neoanglica was first formally described in 1983 by S. Threlfall in the journal Brunonia from specimens collected near Warialda by Edwin Cheel in 1929.

Distribution and habitat
Poison pimelea mostly grows in clay soils on the Great Dividing Range and nearby ranges of eastern Australia from Carnarvon Station Reserve in Queensland to Gloucester in New South Wales.

References

neoanglica
Malvales of Australia
Dioecious plants
Flora of New South Wales
Flora of Queensland
Plants described in 1983